WLKK (107.7 FM) is an American radio station located in Wethersfield, New York.  The station is owned by Audacy, Inc. It operates from studios at Audacy's Buffalo offices in Amherst, New York, with a transmitter located southwest of Warsaw. (For legal purposes, WLKK's official studio was shared with WCJW in Warsaw, a legal fiction which ended with the elimination of the Main Studio Rule by the FCC in 2017). Perhaps at least partly because of the station's unique ability to cover both the Buffalo and the Rochester radio markets with one rimshot signal, WLKK is known for its frequent format changes. Since the early 1980s, the station has changed formats approximately once every four to seven years. Its current format is country music, branded as "107.7 & 104.7 The Wolf".

History

Earliest days: Rural Radio Network

The FM station on 107.7 at Wethersfield originally started broadcasting June 6, 1948 as WFNF, a member of the Rural Radio Network based in Ithaca.

The network changed ownership three times in the 1960s, and was most notable between 1969 and 1981 for being upstate New York's arm of Pat Robertson's original Christian Broadcasting Network as WBIV.

After Robertson sold off the network, the station had become a part of the Buffalo, New York market (despite its position about halfway between Buffalo and Rochester). As a result of its distance from Buffalo, it struggled to gain ratings with multiple formats.

WUWU
"The Sound Future." New Age and Jazz music. 1982-86. Notable only for an offbeat promotional campaign that featured the images and sounds of cows that grazed near the rural transmitter site, and a stunt that involved a "renegade program director" locked himself at the transmitter site and refused to play the music that the management demanded. This was suspiciously similar to the plot of a film that was popular at the time.

WBYR
"The Bear -- High Quality Rock and Roll." Classic rock. 1986-88. WBYR had a brief moment of great success in the classic rock format; the heritage album-oriented rock station, WGRQ-FM, was at the time an adult contemporary music station known as "WRLT," and as such, WBYR was able to make inroads into the Buffalo market. This, however, ended when WRLT changed back to classic rock as WGRF.

WBMW and WEZQ
Beautiful music. 1988 to August 1992. This format was already out of fashion by the time 107.7 adopted it in the late 1980s; most rural beautiful music stations were switching to country music, and 107.7 followed suit after four years.

WNUC
"New Country;" "The Bullet" in its last years. Country music, intended to compete with WYRK (and indirectly WBEE, WPIG and many others). One of its longest-running formats, country on WNUC (under the ownership of John Casciani) ran from August 31, 1992, to October 2000, when the station was sold to Adelphia Communications for $5,600,000.

WNSA

"Western NY Sports Authority" – sports radio. October 2000 to May 2004. This station was a relatively rare monaural FM station, unlike its stereophonic counterparts; this was in part to increase the station's coverage area.

Between October 2000 and April 2004, Empire Sports Network, under VP/GM Bob Koshinski, operated the radio station, aimed at fans from Western New York into the Finger Lakes. The purpose of WNSA's existence was to challenge WGR, Buffalo's often antagonistic sports talk station. Howard Simon was recruited to host morning drive, longtime Buffalo sports talker Art Wander hosted during lunch, and radio newcomer Mike Schopp launched "Sports Talk for Smart People" during the afternoon drive. Later additions would include Jim Brinson, Doug Young (who defected from WGR and is widely credited as the person who landed the interviews and guests that made WNSA so popular), and Zig Fracassi, who had been a nationally syndicated host until the dissolution of the Sports Fan Radio Network. Jim Kelley, Mike Robitaille and Schopp (later replaced by Simon) hosted a two-hour show known as The Sharpshooters prior to Buffalo Sabres games. The station affiliated with Sporting News Radio and was among the first to carry the Sports USA Radio Network's NFL coverage. WNSA carried many of the same sporting events as Empire, including Sabres and Destroyers games, and WNSA consistently outperformed WGR in the ratings for most of its run.

WNSA also held several unique promotions such as the Western New York Sports Symposium, which was a yearly, two-day event held at an event center which included participation by the Buffalo Bills, Buffalo Sabres, Buffalo Bisons and most of the Buffalo area colleges. The symposium featured two days of sports talk from the event location and numerous round table discussions with dozens of notable Buffalo sports team players, coaches, alumni, announcers, and newspaper columnists.

WNSA also created a fictitious radio fantasy hockey game called Sabres Showdown that pitted the Buffalo Sabres 1975 Stanley Cup finalists against the 1999 Sabres finalist squad. The game featured actual Sabres play-by-play man Rick Jeanneret and analyst Mike Robitaille calling the action as well as staged and archival interviews with Sabres players and management from both eras. The taped broadcast was enough of a success to be rerun a year after its original broadcast. Other unique features included "Superfan," a humorous short-form serial about a Buffalo sports fan endowed with superpowers, and "Haseoke," a feature in which audiotapes allegedly from Sabres goaltender Dominik Hašek singing karaoke were played on-air (poking fun at Hašek's thick Bohemian accent).

During Empire's ownership, 107.7 added its first Buffalo-area translator, W297AB in Williamsville, to improve the station's signal quality in Buffalo and the inner-ring suburbs. In December 2018, the translator was transferred to AM 1400, by this point a sister station.

The station's fortunes would collapse when the Rigas/Adelphia Communications scandal was exposed. After filing Chapter 11 bankruptcy, the new Adelphia management decided to sell off WNSA despite its solid performance. That resulted in the retirement of Art Wander, the defection of Mike Schopp to WGR and part-time work at ESPN Radio. Adelphia Communications began to slash WNSA's budget to prepare it for sale. Howard Simon's show was moved to afternoon drive time, began simulcasting on Empire, and was dubbed The SimonCast, and the other personalities, none of whom seemed to be interested in the morning drive slot, rotated the AM shift (WNSA insisted on a local morning show because the Sporting News offering, Murray in the Morning, was deemed too inappropriate for its as-stated "PG-rated" listening audience). Ratings fell below those of WGR toward the end.  The end of WNSA came when the station was sold to WGR's owner, Entercom Communications, in May 2004 for $10.5 million, and announced an immediate format change. Simon's show, however, would continue on WLVL in Lockport until November 2004, when he was recruited to host WGR's morning show.

Many WNSA staffers found jobs at WGR, while others (particularly those who had worked at both WNSA and WNUC) ended up at WYRK. Several hundred hours of WNSA's programming, including several unique specials, were archived by producer Steve Cichon and are available for purchase.

WLKK

The Lake
 "The Lake." May 2004 to April 2011. WLKK maintained and exceeded the number of listeners that the station had during the peak of WNSA's run. The station indirectly took aim at the classic rock market and sought to create a more laid-back, relaxed atmosphere. The playlist of WLKK contained a large portion of hit songs from the 1970s and 1980s (broad enough that the station boasted it never repeated a song throughout an entire 24-hour day), less focused on hard rock and metal than most classic rock stations, but also containing the occasional deep track. In this sense, the station's format was adult album alternative. In addition, the station used a series of bumpers with flowing water, chirping birds, and a deep voice reading the station slogan.

Disc jockeys, which included Hank Dole and Lorne Hunter, occasionally told the story behind the song (sometimes from CD liner notes). They also played WNY musicians on a regular basis and offered a local music show on Monday nights, hosted by Robbie Takac, a local music promoter and member of The Goo Goo Dolls, a band who hails from Buffalo.

After the 2011 format change, the "Lake" format continued on WLKK's HD2 digital subchannel, and without any jocks; all of WLKK's staff was laid off in the change. "The Lake" also continued to maintain its Internet stream, without commercials. The Lake on HD2 was quietly dropped in 2020; a year later, the format would resurface on non-commercial station WBFO-HD2.

WBEN (AM) simulcast
On April 4, 2011, Entercom announced that WLKK would become a complete simulcast of sister station WBEN (AM), effective at Midnight on April 5, 2011. 
For the first year and a half of the simulcast, WLKK was the only station carrying Rush Limbaugh live in the Rochester metropolitan area (Rochester affiliate WHAM carried Limbaugh on a two-hour delay at the time, and WLKK's signal is listenable in many portions of the Rochester metropolitan area); WHAM responded to WLKK's switch to talk by moving its delayed broadcast of Limbaugh up an hour, then eventually to a live slot. Despite an initial announcement that WLKK would not carry the Sabres Hockey Network, WBEN later reversed that decision and announced that Sabres playoff games would be heard on WBEN and WLKK in addition to their flagship station, WGR.

Alternative Buffalo

On September 25, 2013, Entercom announced that WLKK will drop the WBEN simulcast. This was due to the low audience on the FM; in fact, according to an Arbitron study, 90% of WBEN's audience continued to listen on the AM side. At Noon the following day, following "Beach And Company", WLKK changed their format to alternative rock, branded as "Alternative Buffalo 107.7". The first song on "Alternative Buffalo" was "Ho Hey" by The Lumineers. This brings the format back to the market for the first time since 2005, when WEDG shifted to a harder-edged active rock format. Since the format change, there has been an increase in the number of alternative acts that have played Buffalo venues.

Beginning in 2014, the station began holding an annual alternative music concert series called Kerfuffle. The day-long event was held at Canalside in downtown Buffalo.

In May 2014, Family Life Ministries agreed to sell translator W284AP (on 104.7 FM) to Entercom Communications for $125,000. The translator rebroadcast WTSS-HD2, which switched to a simulcast of WLKK on May 11, 2015.

On September 13, 2020, WLKK/W284AP quietly rebranded as "Alt 107.7/104.7", as part of a systemic "revamping" of Entercom's alternative rock stations. As part of the change, Entercom let go of all local on-air personalities from WLKK (except for midday jock Brandi), and began simulcasting WNYL, Entercom's alternative station in New York City, for much of the day.

The Wolf
At 5 p.m. on June 30, 2021, after playing "Good Riddance (Time of Your Life)" by Green Day, WLKK/W284AP flipped to country, branded as "107.7 & 104.7 The Wolf", bringing the format back to the 107.7 FM frequency for the first time since the run as WNUC ended in 2000. As with the later months of the alternative format, the country format on WLKK is largely driven by the national business model of the former Entercom, which rebranded itself as Audacy earlier in the year; the stated reason for making the flip was that Audacy saw "an opportunity to add country" to the Buffalo cluster. Liz Mantel, who had spent six of the previous eight years at WYRK, was the first local personality hired for the station, becoming morning host in September 2021. WLKK continued to carry an alternative-formatted "New Arrivals" format on its HD2 channel until February 2023, when Audacy began to phase out its HD Radio-exclusive subchannels (by which point WBFO-HD2 and WEDG had both adopted alternative formats of their own).

Translator

References

External links

WLKK format and jock history to 2000, via BillDulmage.com
WNUC Web site, from 1997
WNSA Web site, from 2002

LKK
Audacy, Inc. radio stations
Country radio stations in the United States
Radio stations established in 1948
1948 establishments in New York (state)